Nuagada is a village and Community Development Block in the Gajapati District of Odisha state in India. The Block comes under the administrative control of Serango and R.Udayagiri Police station.
The Block had a population of 57,027 in 2020 census.
Mohana (Odisha Vidhan Sabha constituency) (Sl. No.: 136) is its Vidhan Sabha constituency. This constituency includes Mohana block, R.Udayagiri block, Nuagada block and Rayagada block.

Overview 
Nuagada Tehsil is started functioning w.e.f. 01.04.2011 after bifrucated from R.Udayagiri mother Tehsil. Nuagada village is head quarter of Nuagada Tehsil. There are 7 Revenue Inspector circles, 19 Grampanchayat, 175 villages. Covering an area of 463.89 sq. km. This Tehsil surrounded by R. Udayagiri, Rayagada, Mohana Tehsil and Rayagada district. More than 70% of lands are situated in hilly terrain and high lands. Total population of Nuagada Tehsil (2011 Census) was 54696 comprising total 26684 male population and 28012 female population. Total SC population of the Tehsil is 228 and total ST population of the Tehsil is 42145. It has 174 revenue villages.

Climate

Tourist Attractions 
1. Siddheshwar and Siddheshwarī Temple at Nuagada2. Hanuman Temple at Khajuripada3. Radha-Krushna Temple and Baptist Church at Badapada4. Langaleshwar Shiba and Jagannath Temple at Titising5. Dangasil Waterfall beside Paralakhemundi-Mohana NH326A.

Education 
•There are 93 Elementary School, 13 High School and one Higher Secondary School in Khajuripada.

Health Facilities 
17 Govt. Public Health Centre (PHC)and 3 Govt. Hospital are here in this block.

Administration 
There are 19 Gram Panchayat and 181 villages in them. Here is the list below:-

References

Villages in Gajapati district